The 1978 Southern 500, the 29th running of the event, was a NASCAR Winston Cup Series racing event that took place on September 4, 1978, at Darlington Raceway in Darlington, South Carolina.

Background
Darlington Raceway, nicknamed by many NASCAR fans and drivers as "The Lady in Black" or "The Track Too Tough to Tame" and advertised as a "NASCAR Tradition", is a race track built for NASCAR racing located near Darlington, South Carolina. It is of a unique, somewhat egg-shaped design, an oval with the ends of very different configurations, a condition which supposedly arose from the proximity of one end of the track to a minnow pond the owner refused to relocate. This situation makes it very challenging for the crews to set up their cars' handling in a way that will be effective at both ends.

The track is a four-turn  oval. The track's first two turns are banked at twenty-five degrees, while the final two turns are banked two degrees lower at twenty-three degrees. The front stretch (the location of the finish line) and the back stretch are banked at six degrees. Darlington Raceway can seat up to 60,000 people.

Darlington has something of a legendary quality among drivers and older fans; this is probably due to its long track length relative to other NASCAR speedways of its era and hence the first venue where many of them became cognizant of the truly high speeds that stock cars could achieve on a long track. The track allegedly earned the moniker The Lady in Black because the night before the race the track maintenance crew would cover the entire track with fresh asphalt sealant, in the early years of the speedway, thus making the racing surface dark black. Darlington is also known as "The Track Too Tough to Tame" because drivers can run lap after lap without a problem and then bounce off of the wall the following lap. Racers will frequently explain that they have to race the racetrack, not their competition. Drivers hitting the wall are considered to have received their "Darlington Stripe" thanks to the missing paint on the right side of the car.

Race report
40 competitors competed in this 367-lap race. A crowd of 65000  fans cheered them on for four hours and seventeen minutes.  Nine cautions slowed the race for 72 laps; 21 changes for first-place position were made. The race leader remained unchanged for long periods of time; including Cale Yarborough's 69-lap lead which lasted from lap 118 to lap 186 and his late-race streak where he would take over the lead on lap 261 and would never relinquish it.

Cale Yarborough would defeat future NASCAR on Fox personality Darrell Waltrip by three seconds while Richard Petty, rookie driver Terry Labonte, and Bobby Allison would round out the top five finishers. Yarborough's win would become his fourth at the Southern 500. Terry Labonte would make an impressive Winston Cup debut at this race. He was 11 laps down at the end, but finished fourth.

Yarborough would retain the lead in championship points after this race. Bruce Hill would finish in last place on lap 80 due to a problem with his vehicle's rear end. D. K. Ulrich was cited for nitrous oxide in his vehicle and lost the rest of the 1978 Winston Cup Series season. Neil Bonnett had the most unfortunate incident by hitting the telephone wires while exiting pit road; nobody was injured.

Notable crew chiefs who participated in the race were Darrell Bryant, Junie Donlavey, Buddy Parrott, Jake Elder, Joey Arrington, Kirk Shelmerdine, Dale Inman and Bud Moore.

The total purse of the race was $200,170 ($ when considering inflation); Yarborough received $30,175 for winning the race. ($ when considering inflation).

Qualifying

Top 10 finishers

Standings after the race

References

Southern 500
Southern 500
NASCAR races at Darlington Raceway